Askalu Menkerios is the current Minister of Tourism and former Minister of Labor and Social Welfare of Eritrea. She was born and raised in Eritrea. She is a member of the People's Front for Democracy and Justice (PFDJ).

References

External links
 Picture of Askalu Menkerios, who is fourth from left

Government ministers of Eritrea
People's Front for Democracy and Justice politicians
Living people
Year of birth missing (living people)
Women government ministers of Eritrea